Norman Perrin (29 November 1920 – 25 November 1976) was an English-born, American biblical scholar at the University of Chicago. Perrin specialized in the study of the New Testament, and was internationally known for his work on the teaching of Jesus, as well as on the Redaction Criticism of the New Testament.

Life and career
Perrin was born in Wellingborough, Northamptonshire, England, and served from 1940 to 1945, during the Second World War, in the Royal Air Force. He earned a Bachelor of Arts degree (in theology) in 1949 from the Victoria University of Manchester. In 1952, he earned a Bachelor of Divinity degree (with honours), and in 1956 a Master of Theology (in Greek New Testament and apocryphal studies), both from the University of London. Perrin was granted his Doctorate of Theology from the University of Göttingen in 1959. From 1959 to 1964, he taught New Testament at the Candler School of Theology, Emory University, and from 1964 until his death in 1976 at the Divinity School of the University of Chicago. Perrin served as president of the Chicago Society of Biblical Research in 1972–1973, and as president of the Society of Biblical Literature in 1973.

Selected works

Bibliography
 The Journal of Religion 64 (1984), Norman Perrin 1920-1976; includes a previously unpublished essay by Perrin and academic tributes by colleagues. 
 David Abernathy, Understanding the Teaching of Jesus: Based on the Lecture Series of Norman Perrin (New York : Seabury Press, 1983).
 Calvin R. Mercer, "Norman Perrin: A Scholarly Pilgrim" (Ph.D. dissertation, Florida State University, 1983).
 Welton O. Seal, Jr., "Norman Perrin and His 'School': Retracing a Pilgrimage", Journal for the Study of the New Testament (1984), pp. 87–107.
 Welton O. Seal, Jr., "The Parousia in Mark: A Debate with Norman Perrin and 'His School'" (Ph.D. dissertation, Union Theological Seminary, 1981).
 Criterion, vol. 16, no. 1 (Winter 1977); personal tributes to Norman Perrin, from a memorial service held in the Joseph Bond Chapel, 30 November 1976

References

External links

Guide to the Norman Perrin Papers 1964-1977 at the University of Chicago Special Collections Research Center

1920 births
1976 deaths
People from Wellingborough
Alumni of the University of London
University of Göttingen alumni
American Christian theologians
American biblical scholars
New Testament scholars
Emory University faculty
University of Chicago faculty
University of Chicago Divinity School faculty
British emigrants to the United States